is a former Japanese football player and manager. He managed the Bhutan national team. His brother Yoshiyuki Matsuyama is also former footballer.

Playing career
Matsuyama was born in Kyoto Prefecture on August 31, 1967. After graduating from Waseda University, he joined Furukawa Electric in 1990. His brother Yoshiyuki Matsuyama also played this club then. However he could not play at all in the match. In 1991, he moved to Fujita Industries (later Bellmare Hiratsuka). He became a regular player and the club won the champions in 1993 and was promoted to J1 League from 1994. However he could hardly play in the match from 1994 and he moved to Japan Football League (JFL) club Tosu Futures in June 1995. However he could hardly play in the match. In 1996, he moved to JFL club Consadole Sapporo. However he could not play at all in the match and he retired end of 1996 season.

Coaching career
After retirement, Matsuyama started coaching career at Consadole Sapporo in 1996. He coached the club until 1998. In 2004, he signed with Vissel Kobe and became a manager for reserve team in 1 season. In 2006, he signed with Oita Trinita. In July 2009, manager Péricles Chamusca was sacked. He managed the club in 1 match until the club signed with new manager Ranko Popović. In May 2010, he left the club and became a manager for Bhutan national team. He managed Bhutan until 2012.

Club statistics

Managerial statistics

References

External links
 
 

1967 births
Living people
Waseda University alumni
Association football people from Kyoto Prefecture
Japanese footballers
Japan Soccer League players
J1 League players
Japan Football League (1992–1998) players
JEF United Chiba players
Shonan Bellmare players
Sagan Tosu players
Hokkaido Consadole Sapporo players
Japanese football managers
J1 League managers
Oita Trinita managers
Bhutan national football team managers
Japanese expatriates in Bhutan
Expatriate football managers in Bhutan
Association football midfielders